Parque Central can refer to:

Parque Central, Havana, Cuba
Estadio Gran Parque Central, a soccer stadium in Montevideo, Uruguay
Parque Central Complex, centered on twin 56-story towers in Caracas, Venezuela
 Parque Central station, on the Caracas Metro
Parque Central (Honduras), a public park near San  Pedro Sula cathedral